The 1999 Great American Insurance ATP Championships, also known as the Cincinnati Open, was a men's tennis tournament played on outdoor Clay courts. It was the 98th edition of the tournament previously known as the Thriftway ATP Championships, and was part of the ATP Super 9 of the 1999 ATP Tour. It took place in Mason, Ohio, USA, from August 9 through August 16, 1999. The singles title was won by first-seeded Pete Sampras.

The tournament had previously appeared on the Tier III of the WTA Tour but no event was held from 1989 to 2003.

Finals

Singles

 Pete Sampras defeated  Patrick Rafter, 7–6(9–7), 6–3
It was Pete Sampras' 4th title of the year and his 60th overall. It was his 1st Masters title of the year and his 10th overall. It was his 2nd title at the event after winning in 1992 and 1997.

Doubles

 Jonas Björkman /  Byron Black defeated  Todd Woodbridge /  Mark Woodforde 6–3, 7–6(8–6)

References

External links
 
 ATP tournament profile

 
Cincinnati Masters
Cincinnati Masters
Great American Insurance ATP Championships
Great American Insurance ATP Championships